Duke of Ragusa may refer to:

 Duke of Ragusa (Marmont), a French title of nobility, created in 1808
 Duke of Ragusa (Habsburg), an Austrian title of nobility, created in 1814
 the term is sometimes also used (colloquially, and incorrectly) for the Rector of Ragusa

See also
 Duke (disambiguation)
 Ragusa (disambiguation)